Rijkswaterstaat, founded in 1798 as the Bureau voor den Waterstaat and formerly translated to Directorate General for Public Works and Water Management, is a Directorate-General of the Ministry of Infrastructure and Water Management of the Netherlands. Its role is the practical execution of the public works and water management, including the construction and maintenance of waterways and roads, and flood protection and prevention. The agency was also involved in the construction of big railway projects such as the Betuweroute and the HSL-Zuid.

The mission of the organisation is: "Rijkswaterstaat is de rijksdienst die werkt aan droge voeten, schoon en voldoende water én aan de vlotte en veilige doorstroming van het verkeer" (Rijkswaterstaat is the national agency that provides dry feet, clean and sufficient water and a quick and safe flow of traffic). The agency is divided in 10 regional, 6 specialist services and 2 special services.

As of 15 May 2017, the director-general (DG) of Rijkswaterstaat is Michèle Blom. Since 1 January 2006, Rijkswaterstaat has been an (executive) agentschap (agency).

Name
The Dutch word waterstaat denotes the condition of an area in relation to the level and the condition of surface and groundwater, including all relevant natural and artificial features. The component 'rijks' translates as 'national'.

Organization structure 
Rijkswaterstaat is divided in regional and specialist services, formerly known as directies. Every service is managed by a hoofdingenieur-directeur (HID), who together form the board of Rijkswaterstaat.

Regional services

The regions are divided in local water- en wegendistricten (water and road districts), formerly known as dienstkringen. In the past, every province had its own regional organisation, but the directies Groningen, Friesland and Drenthe were merged, forming the service Noord-Nederland, the directies Overijssel and Gelderland were merged to form the service Oost-Nederland, the directies IJsselmeergebied and Utrecht were merged to form the service Midden-Nederland and the directies Noord-Brabant and Limburg were merged to form the service Zuid-Nederland.
The following regional services exist:
RWS Noord-Nederland (located in Leeuwarden)
RWS West Nederland Noord (located in Haarlem)
RWS Midden-Nederland (located in Utrecht and Lelystad)
RWS Oost-Nederland (located in Arnhem)
RWS West Nederland Zuid (located in Rotterdam)
RWS Zee en Delta (located in Middelburg)
RWS Zuid-Nederland (located in 's-Hertogenbosch and Maastricht)

Specialist Services

Water, Traffic and Environment, RWS WVL (located in Utrecht, Rijswijk and Lelystad)
Programmes, Projects and Maintenance, RWS PPO (located in Utrecht)
Major Projects and Maintenance, RWS GPO (located in Utrecht)
Traffic- and Water Management, RWS VWM (located in Utrecht, Rotterdam and Lelystad)
Central Information Services, RWS CIV (located in Delft)
Centre for Corporate services, RWS CD (located in Utrecht)
Nova, RWS nova (located in Utrecht)

Project Directorates (Special Services)
Room for the River, RWS RVR (located in Utrecht)

Former (specialist) services
Projectdirectie Maaswerken, Tomorrow's Meuse (located in Maastricht and Roermond). 2003 - 2010
Projectdirectie HSL-Zuid, High Speed Line South (located in Zoetermeer). 2001 - 2009
Waterstaatskerken
Deltadienst
Rijksdienst voor de IJsselmeerpolders, National Institute for polders in the IJsselmeer
Rijksinstituut voor Kust en Zee, National Institute for the Coast and Sea (located in The Hague)
Rijksinstituut voor Integraal Zoetwaterbeheer en Afvalwaterbehandeling, National Institute for integral Fresh Water management and Waste Treatment (located in Lelystad)
Dienst voor Weg en Waterbouwkunde, Service for Road- and Waterarchitecture (located in Delft)
Adviesdienst Verkeer en Vervoer, Advisory service Traffic and Transport (located in Rotterdam)

Notable employees 
Elze van den Ban

Related Dutch institutes
Deltares
Kadaster

References

External links
Official website www.rijkswaterstaat.nl
Rijkswaterstaat as an agency
Rijkswaterstaat organizational overview

Government agencies of the Netherlands
Dutch words and phrases
Water management authorities in the Netherlands
Inland waterway authorities
Road authorities
Transport organisations based in the Netherlands